Felthorpe is a village and civil parish in the English county of Norfolk.

History
Felthorpe's name is of mixed Anglo-Saxon and Viking origin and derives from an amalgamation of the Old Norse and Old English for Faela's outlying farmstead or settlement.

In the Domesday Book, Felthorpe is listed as a settlement of 45 households in the hundred of Taverham. In 1086, the village was divided between the East Anglian estates of King William I, Alan of Brittany, Ralph de Beaufour, Walter Giffard and Reginald, son of Ivo.

Felthorpe Watermill stood in the village, on a small tributary of the River Wensum, since the later-Medieval period. In 1883, the mill was upgraded with a steam engine and subsequently demolished in 1927 though some foundations of the building and the wheelrace remain. Felthorpe Windmill stood within the parish from the late-Eighteenth Century and closed sometime in the early-Twentieth Century. The land has reverted to agricultural use.

Felthorpe Hall was built in the Nineteenth Century as a manor house and still stands today as a Grade II listed private residence. The hall was used as a Red Cross convalescence hospital during the First and Second World Wars.

Geography
According to the 2011 Census, Felthorpe has a population of 745 residents living in 308 households.

Felthorpe falls within the constituency of Broadland and is represented at Parliament by Jerome Mayhew MP of the Conservative Party. For the purposes of local government, the parish falls within the district of Broadland.

St. Margaret's Church
Felthorpe's parish church is dedicated to Saint Margaret of Antioch and dates from the Seventeenth Century, with significant Nineteenth Century restoration to the exterior and interior. St. Margaret's has a good range of stained-glass installed by Ward and Hughes with a further stone memorial plaque to Richard Inglett Fortescue Weston Conway who died in the British colony of Demerara in 1856.

Felthorpe Air Crash

In June 1966, a Hawker Siddeley Trident jetliner crashed in the parish after the aircraft entered into a deep stall and the pilot failed to correct it. The aircraft was on a test flight from Hatfield Aerodrome and all four passengers were killed in the crash.

Amenities
The village public house has stood on its current site since the end of the Eighteenth Century and is still open today. The Mariner's Arms has been previously operated by Bullard's of Norwich, Watney-Mann and Brent Walker but today operates as a freehouse.

War Memorial
St. Margaret's Church holds two memorials to the First World War, one a carved church screen detailing the men of Felthorpe who died during the conflict and a framed Roll of Honour with all the names of the men who served. The memorial lists the following men as fallen during the First World War:
 L-Cpl. George C. Stannard (1894-1918), 49th (Edmonton) Battalion, Canadian Expeditionary Force
 Gnr. Sidney G. Palmer (1890-1918), 133rd (Heavy) Battery, Royal Garrison Artillery
 Pvt. H. James Dack (d.1916), 8th Battalion, Royal Norfolk Regiment
 Pvt. Brian T. Betts (1897-1917), 7th Battalion, Suffolk Regiment
 Pvt. Leslie J. Arterton (d.1917), 2nd Battalion, Queen's Royal Regiment
 Pvt. George Cullum (d.1916), 4th Battalion, South Wales Borderers
 Pvt. Percy Barney (d.1917), 10th Battalion, York and Lancaster Regiment
 Arthur H. Miller
 Frank Wilkinson

References

External links

Broadland
Villages in Norfolk
Civil parishes in Norfolk